LV Cup may refer to:

 Louis Vuitton Cup, a yachting event
 Anglo-Welsh Cup, a rugby union event